The Premio 40 Principales for Best International Video is an honor presented annually since 2013 at Los Premios 40 Principales.

References

Awards established in 2013
Los Premios 40 Principales
Spanish music awards